Rhodanobacter fulvus is a Gram-negative, aerobic, rod-shaped and motile bacterium from the genus of Rhodanobacter which has been isolated from rotten rice straw with soil from Daejon in Korea. Rhodanobacter fulvus produce beta-galactosidase.

References

Xanthomonadales
Bacteria described in 2005